Michael Pacek is a Canadian film editor. Pacek has been nominated for three Genie awards for film editing. He won two Genie Awards for his work on Bruce McDonald's Dance Me Outside (1994).

Pacek is a member of the Canadian Cinema Editors honours society.

Recognition
1996 Winner, Genie Award for "Best Achievement in Editing" - Dance Me Outside (1994)
1996 Winner, Genie Award for "Best Achievement in Sound Editing" - Dance Me Outside (1994) (Shared with Steve Munro, Andy Malcom, Peter Winniger, Michael Werth)
1992 Genie Award for "Best Achievement in Film Editing" - Highway 61 (1991) - Nominated

References

The Film Reference Library

External links

Best Editing Genie and Canadian Screen Award winners
Best Sound Editing Genie and Canadian Screen Award winners
Canadian film editors
Living people
Year of birth missing (living people)
Canadian sound editors